Jordanstown is a townland (of 964 acres) and electoral ward in County Antrim, Northern Ireland. It is within the urban area of Newtownabbey and the Antrim and Newtownabbey Borough Council area. It is also situated in the civil parish of Carnmoney and the historic barony of Belfast Lower. It had a population of 6,225 in the 2011 census, with an average age of 40.

Jordanstown includes a University of Ulster campus, a bowling club, a few schools and shops. It also has a beach and seafront park area called Loughshore Park, which hosts various events throughout the year including the three-day Loughshore Festival over the last weekend in August. The park sits on the shore of Belfast Lough.

Name 
The place is named from an Anglo-Norman family called Jordan who accompanied John de Courcy to Carrickfergus in 1182. The surname Jordan is ultimately derived from the river Jordan, the name of which was used as a Christian name by returning crusaders who brought back Jordan water to baptise their children [Bally Jurdon 1604].

History

Development
Jordanstown was a semi-rural district until the 1950s when it expanded rapidly with the construction of new housing. Middle-class families were attracted to the area due to its location adjacent to Belfast Lough and the railway station, which provides access to Belfast City Centre.

The Troubles
On 4 November 1983, 28-year-olds John Martin and Stephen Fyfe, and 29-year-old William McDonald, all members of the Royal Ulster Constabulary (RUC), were killed by a Provisional Irish Republican Army time bomb, hidden in the ceiling of a classroom, which exploded during a lecture to RUC members at the Ulster Polytechnic, Jordanstown, now a campus of Ulster University. Nuala O'Loan, in her capacity as a prison independent custody visitor (ICV), who was named Northern Ireland's first Police Ombudsman many years later, was injured in the attack, and, pregnant, lost the baby she was carrying at the time.

Demography
On Census Day (27 March 2011) the usually resident population of Jordanstown was 6,225 accounting for 0.34% of the NI total. Of these:
 97.61% were from the white (including Irish Traveller) ethnic group
 14.22% belong to or were brought up Catholic and 74.84% belong to or were brought up in a 'Protestant and other (non-Catholic) Christian (including Christian related)' 
 70.94% indicated that they had a British national identity, 11.45% had an Irish national identity and 33.80% had a Northern Irish national identity.

Transport
Jordanstown railway station was opened on 1 February 1853.

Churches
Churches in Jordanstown include St. Patrick's Church (Church of Ireland) and Whiteabbey Presbyterian Church (Presbyterian).

Sport
U.U.J. F.C. play association football in the Northern Amateur Football League.

Education 
 Whiteabbey Primary School
 Jordanstown Schools for the Deaf and Blind.
 Thornfield House School for those with Specific Speech Impairments.
 Rosstulla Special School
 Monkstown Community High School
 Belfast High School
 University of Ulster

Local councillors and MLAs 
Jordanstown is covered by the university district electoral area of Newtownabbey Borough Council.

Local Members of the Legislative Assembly (MLAs) for the area include:
 Sammy Wilson (DUP)
 David Hilditch (DUP)
 Alastair Ross (DUP)
 Roy Beggs (UUP)
 Ken Robinson (UUP)
 Sean Neeson (Alliance)

Demographics 

Jordanstown is a small settlement within Belfast Metropolitan Urban Area (BMUA). On Census day (29 April 2001) there were 5,494 people living in Jordanstown. Of these:

 16.9% were under 16 years old and 48.9% were aged 60 and above
 32.6% of the population were male and 50.5% were female

References

Townlands of County Antrim
Wards of Northern Ireland